The Men's Combined in the 2017 FIS Alpine Skiing World Cup involved two events. Defending discipline champion Alexis Pinturault of France upset overall slalom discipline leader Marcel Hirscher in the slalom leg to win the first combined of the season at Santa Caterina, Italy. When Hirscher opted to skip the second combined, Pinturault was heavily favored in the race at Wengen, Switzerland as well, but heavy falling snow during the downhill leg (which, for a change, was run last due to the conditions) provided a huge edge to the early starters and led to a shock podium topped by Niels Hintermann of Switzerland, who had never before finished in the top 20 in a World Cup race—and Pinturault only placed 20th after sitting fourth following the slalom leg. Nevertheless, combining that showing with his prior victory was sufficient to give Pinturault the discipline crown (and the crystal globe) for the 2016–17 season.

The season was interrupted by the 2017 World Ski Championships, which were held from 6–20 February in St. Moritz, Switzerland. The men's combined (run as a super-combined, with a downhill followed by a slalom) was held on 13 February.

At this time, combined races were not included in the season finals, which were scheduled in 2017 in Aspen, Colorado (USA).

Standings

DNS = Did Not Start
DNS2 = Finished run 1; Did Not Start run 2
DNF1 = Did Not Finish run 1
DNF2 = Did Not Finish run 2

See also
 2017 Alpine Skiing World Cup – Men's summary rankings
 2017 Alpine Skiing World Cup – Men's Overall
 2017 Alpine Skiing World Cup – Men's Downhill
 2017 Alpine Skiing World Cup – Men's Super-G
 2017 Alpine Skiing World Cup – Men's Giant Slalom
 2017 Alpine Skiing World Cup – Men's Slalom

References

External links
 Alpine Skiing at FIS website

Men's Combined
FIS Alpine Ski World Cup men's combined discipline titles